Sachiko Sugiyama (杉山 祥子, Sugiyama Sachiko, born October 19, 1979) is a volleyball player from Japan, who competed at the 2004 Summer Olympics in Athens, Greece, wearing the number #12 jersey. There she ended up in fifth place with the Japan women's national team. Sugiyama played as a middle-blocker.

Clubs
Fujimi High School → NEC Red Rockets (1998-)

National team
 Junior National Team (1997)
 National Team (2000–2008)

Honours
Team
2003: 5th place in the World Cup in Japan
2004: 5th place in the Olympic Games of Athens
2006: 6th place in the World Championship in Japan
2007: 7th place in the World Cup in Japan
2008: 5th place in the Olympic Games of Beijing
Individual
1998 5thV.League New Face award
2002 8thV.League Spike award, Best6
2003 9thV.League Best6
2004 10thV.League Best6, Block award
2006 12thV.League Best6, Block award
2009 2008-09Premier League Best6, Block award

External links
 FIVB biography

1979 births
Living people
Japanese women's volleyball players
Volleyball players at the 2004 Summer Olympics
Volleyball players at the 2008 Summer Olympics
Olympic volleyball players of Japan
NEC Red Rockets players
Place of birth missing (living people)
Asian Games medalists in volleyball
Volleyball players at the 2002 Asian Games
Volleyball players at the 2006 Asian Games
Asian Games silver medalists for Japan
Asian Games bronze medalists for Japan
Medalists at the 2002 Asian Games
Medalists at the 2006 Asian Games